E. K. Aboobacker Musliyar, known by followers as Shams-ul-Ulama, "the Sun of the Scholars", was a Shafi'i scholar and community leader from Kerala, south India. He served as the General Secretary of the All-Kerala Jam'iyyat al-'Ulama', the principal Sunni-Shafi'i scholarly body in Kerala, from 1957 to 1996.

Ezhuthachan Kandi Aboobacker was born in 1914, to E. K. Koya Kutty and Adiyottil Fathima, at Parambilkadavu, near the city of Kozhikode. After the initial education from a number of Kerala-based scholars, he joined the al-Bakiyat-us-Salihat College at Vellore for higher studies.

He later served as the principal of Jamia Nuriya Arabic College, Pattikkad.

E. K. Aboobacker Musliyar died on 19 August 1996.

References

1914 births
1996 deaths
Indian imams
People from Kozhikode district
Indian Sunni Muslim scholars of Islam
Islam in Kerala
Kerala Sunni-Shafi'i scholars